Siniša Rutešić (born 17 October 1960) is a Croatian rowing coxswain. He competed in the men's coxed pair event at the 1976 Summer Olympics.

References

1960 births
Living people
Croatian male rowers
Olympic rowers of Yugoslavia
Rowers at the 1976 Summer Olympics
Sportspeople from Šibenik